The history of art in the San Francisco Bay Area includes major contributions to contemporary art, including Abstract Expressionism. The area is known for its cross-disciplinary artists like Bruce Conner, Bruce Nauman, and Peter Voulkos as well as a large number of non-profit alternative art spaces including New Langton Arts, Intersection for the Arts, and Southern Exposure.  San Francisco Bay Area Visual Arts has undergone many permutations paralleling  innovation and hybridity in literature and theater.

Artists 1950-present 
Paralleling a new interest in eastern philosophy and Zen via Alan Watts and the literary and poetic irreverence of Lawrence Ferlinghetti, Allen Ginsberg, and others, visual artists such as Bruce Conner and Jay DeFeo diverged from the Abstract Expressionism of the east coast to make connections between sculpture and painting. Connor's found material assemblages, collages and experimental films make him an early cross-disciplinary pioneer.

Painter Wayne Thiebaud's paintings of commonplace products such as toys or gumball machines paralleled the pop influenced Funk style. Involving bright colors, humor and word-play, Funk is most often associated with the ceramic work of Robert Arneson, and the paintings of William T. Wiley. All three, along with Roy De Forest and Manuel Neri taught at UC Davis in the 60s and 70s. (Artist and educator Peter Voulkos set the stage for Funk by reengaging ceramics as part of contemporary studio practice.) Bruce Nauman, who is often credited with dissolving the medium specific practices of previous generations, went to UC Davis and studied under William Wiley.  

By the end of the 1960s Conceptual Art and Minimal Art were reforming the aesthetics and values of visual art. Bay Area artists responded to the dominance of the white cube, and transitioned from an object-oriented to a systems-oriented practice inspired by Marcel Duchamp. In the Bay Area, starting in the 1970s, Artists such as Tom Marioni, Paul Kos, Howard Fried and Terry Fox, explored the intersection of performance and sculpture. Also picking up on conceptualism, with an added materialist strain, was David Ireland. Tony Labat brought a political dimension to Bay Area conceptualism, with video, performance and installation works that confronted issues of cultural identity, loss and displacement.

In 1967 The Experimental Television Project (later renamed the National Center for Experiments in Television), housed at KQED studios was one of the first programs in the nation to give artists access to television studios and equipment. Groups like Ant Farm, Video Free America, and T.R. Uthco working in the same moment were video recording "happening" performances, and experimenting with light sound and time.

Public Art
The San Francisco Bay Area has a variety of public art, including murals and graffiti in many locations.

Art Spaces
 New Langton Arts
 Southern Exposure
 Yerba Buena Center for the Arts
 The LAB
 Intersection for the Arts
 The BoxShop

Schools
California College of the Arts
San Francisco Art Institute

See also

Art in the San Francisco Bay Area, 1945-1980, a comprehensive history of the period, by Thomas Albright.
:Category:Artists from the San Francisco Bay Area
Bolinas, an artists colony in Marin County

References

External links
 Epicenter: San Francisco Bay Area Art Now (google books)

 
American contemporary art
History of the San Francisco Bay Area